The Mermaid Beach Resort (MBR) is an integrated resort, located in Pechar Dwip, beside the beach near Cox's Bazar–Tekhnaf Marine Drive, at Himchari, Cox's Bazar, Bangladesh. It offers easy access to a secluded beach. In 2015, the resort has been received Certificate of Excellence award honors for their hospitality businesses that consistently achieve outstanding reviews on TripAdvisor.

Description
There are two restaurants at the Resort, one café special for Italian food and another restaurant offers world cuisine.

Gallery

Sister resorts

Mermaid Beach House Collection
Mermaid Beach House Collection is a beach house located just one kilometre away from the Mermaid Beach Resort.

Mermaid Ecoresort

Mermaid Ecoresort is another sister resort located just one kilometre away from the Mermaid Beach Resort.

References

External links

Resorts in Bangladesh
Island resorts
Cox's Bazar District